Knightfall may refer to:
 Knightfall (comics), a fictional DC Comics character
 Operation: Knightfall, the codename for the attack on the Jedi Temple during Star Wars: Episode III – Revenge of the Sith
 Knightfall (TV series), an American historical fiction drama television series
 "Knight Fall", an episode of the sixth season of House
 "Knightfall" (Once Upon a Time), an episode of the seventh season of Once Upon a Time
 Knightfall (album), an album by Silent Images
 Batman: Knightfall, a 1993–1994 Batman story arc published by DC Comics

See also
 Nightfall (disambiguation)